Elisabeth Branäs (15 June 1930 – 19 February 2010) was a Swedish female curler.

She was a two-time  and three-time Swedish women's champion.

In 1977 she was inducted into the Swedish Curling Hall of Fame.

Teams

References

External links
 

1930 births
2010 deaths
Swedish female curlers
European curling champions
Swedish curling champions